Currywurst is a fast food dish of German origin consisting of steamed, fried sausage, usually pork, typically cut into bite-sized chunks and seasoned with curry ketchup, a sauce based on spiced ketchup or tomato paste topped with curry powder, or a ready-made ketchup seasoned with curry and other spices. The dish is often served with chips.

History

The invention of currywurst is attributed to Herta Heuwer in Berlin in 1949, after she obtained ketchup (or possibly Worcestershire sauce) and curry powder from British soldiers in Germany. She mixed these ingredients with other spices and poured it over grilled pork sausage. Heuwer started selling the cheap but filling snack at a street stand in the Charlottenburg district of Berlin, where it became popular with construction workers rebuilding the devastated city. She patented her sauce under the name "Chillup" in 1951. At its height the stand was selling 10,000 servings per week. She later opened a small restaurant which operated until 1974. On 30 June 2013 Heuwer's 100th birthday was celebrated with a Google Doodle.

Today,  is often sold as a take-out/take-away food, Schnellimbisse (snack stands), at diners or "greasy spoons," on children's menus in restaurants, or as a street food and usually served with chips or bread rolls (Brötchen). It is popular all over Germany but especially in the metropolitan areas of Berlin, Hamburg and the Ruhr Area. Considerable variation, both in the type of sausage used and the ingredients of the sauce, occurs between these areas. Common variations include the addition of paprika or chopped onions; halal food stands often prepare currywurst with beef sausage. Often currywurst is sold in food booths, sometimes using a special machine to slice it into pieces, and served on a paper plate with a little wooden or plastic fork, mostly a Currywurst fork. It is also sold as a supermarket-shelf product to prepare at home.

The Deutsches Currywurst Museum estimated that 800 million currywursts are eaten every year in Germany, with 70 million in Berlin alone. The Volkswagen plant at Wolfsburg runs its own butchery producing about 7 million Volkswagen currywursts per year, serving many directly to Volkswagen employees.

In popular culture

Former Chancellor Gerhard Schröder is a noted fan of currywurst. By tradition, every candidate for the mayor of Berlin is photographed at a currywurst stand.

The song "Currywurst" on Herbert Grönemeyer's 1982 album Total Egal is a tribute to the snack.

The 1993 novel Die Entdeckung der Currywurst (English title: "The Invention of Curried Sausage") by Uwe Timm was made into a 1998 play and a 2008 film both of the same name. The plot is based on an alternative but unproven theory that currywurst was invented in Hamburg.

The Deutsches Currywurst Museum opened in Berlin on 15 August 2009, commemorating the 60th anniversary of its creation. Curator Martin Loewer said "No other national German dish inspires so much history and has so many well-known fans". The museum received approximately 350,000 visitors annually. It permanently closed on 21 December 2018.

In 2019 Berlin State Mint issued a commemorative currywurst coin celebrating the 70 years since the savoury snack was first sold in Berlin by Herta Heuwer. The silver alloy coin features two currywursts pierced with a wooden chip fork and poured with the sauce (coloured by print), and Herta Heuwer in the background (caption: 70 Jahre Currywurst). The other side of the coin shows the Brandenburg Gate (caption: Münze Berlin, 2019).

See also

 German cuisine
 List of sausage dishes
 Salchipapa

References

Further reading

External links

Deutsches Currywurst Museum Berlin
Original Berliner Currywurst 
Berlin's obsession with currywurst - BBC News report
Trying to perfect the recipe at home for BAOR veterans
Currywurst is The Secret Weapon - AEG Perfunkt video about a West Berlin cult snack shop
NY Times Jan 26, 2011 - National Dish Comes Wrapped in Foreign Flavoring

Berlin cuisine
Fast food
German sausages
Sausage dishes
Street food
1949 in Germany
Curry dishes